Hot Sauce is the first studio album by South Korean boy band NCT Dream, the third sub-unit of the South Korean boy band NCT. It was released on May 10, 2021, through SM Entertainment. Following their previous EP, Reload, this album marks NCT Dream's first full-length album and the first to feature back as a seven-member unit following the return of Mark from the termination of the age-based graduation system that was operated in the group. Hot Sauce is one of the best-selling albums in South Korea.

The album was repackaged as Hello Future on June 28, featuring 3 new tracks including the lead single of the same name.

Background and release 
On May 10, NCT Dream released their first studio album, Hot Sauce, which marked the group's first full album release as a 7-member unit since 2018 and the group's first full-length album after nearly a five-year career.

Composition 
The title track "Hot Sauce" is described as a hip-hop song laid over an afrobeat. The contrast of the unique chanting in the chorus helps the otherwise minimalist track to stand out. The album's first b-side track, "Diggity" is a pop dance song with a groovy beat and a refreshing chorus. In addition, "Dive Into You" is a song featuring band instruments with an attractive contrast between an emotional melody and a sense of speed. As a sound-based mid-tempo R&B pop song, the lyrics express the relationship between "me and you" in relation to the whale and the sea, vividly expressing the desire to fall deeply into your arms as a whale swims in the sea. "My Youth" is an upbeat R&B pop song that harmonizes the members' lyrical chorus with a tempo-sensory 8-beat rhythm. The lyrics expressing gratitude for the beautifully shining season are impressive, recalling the pure emotions and memories generously given to each other. "Rocket" is a retro pop song with an attractive atmosphere created by the funky rhythmic Rhodes keyboard and organ sound. The lyrics expressed as 'Dream Rocket' contain the aspiration to take a bigger leap forward using the universe as a stage. "Countdown (3, 2, 1)" is a pop dance song that stands out with an intense 808 bass and an addictive trap beat chorus. The lyrics describe suppressed dreams exploding out of the world becoming bigger impressive dreams. NCT Dream's "ANL", with its unique refreshing charm, has a popping lead synth sound and brass. It is a synth pop song with a harmonious session. Like the moon floating in the night sky every day, the lyrics that metaphorically express the thoughts toward the other person that keeps rising in the head add to the joy of listening. "Irreplaceable" contains a vintage keyboard sound, percussion instrument, brass, etc. A medium-tempo song with a swing rhythm that harmonizes the lively instruments with the lyrics, it tells of the preciousness of you, who cannot be replaced by anything else, doubling the excitement of the song. The album's penultimate track, "Be There For You" is a ballad song sung by Haechan, Renjun and Chenle, whose voices stand out with light and emotional vocals over the smooth piano melody that leads the whole song. With its acoustic guitar sound and rich harmony of chorus, it creates a warm atmosphere with lyrics that convey the sincerity that you want to always be with the members. The final track, "Rainbow", is an R&B pop song with a comfortable guitar sound that leads the song. With the members' sincere vocals added to this album, expressed by comparing this album to a book with bookmarks, and a message that the seven members create a new page together like a beautiful rainbow, members Mark, Jeno, Jaemin and Jisung participated in writing the rap lyrics, adding an extra layer of authenticity.

Promotion 
From April 17 to May 7, the group was featured in the travel entertainment series 7llin in the Dream, posted on their official YouTube channel to officially begin promotions as a 7-member group. On the day of the album and music video release, the group hosted a live broadcast on Naver's V Live to discuss about the album. On May 11, the group held a comeback show that was broadcast through various online platforms such as YouTube, V Live, Twitter and TikTok. The show included performances of tracks from Hot Sauce, as well as 7-member version of their previous singles "Boom" and "Ridin'". NCT Dream promoted the album on various South Korean music programs. On May 13, the group made their first music show appearance on M Countdown by performing the tracks "Dive Into You" and "Hot Sauce" and was followed by performances in Music Bank, Show! Music Core and Inkigayo in the same week. They earned their first music show trophy for "Hot Sauce" on the May 19th episode of Show Champion and achieved a total of eight trophies by the end of the promotions.

Commercial performance 
On May 9, the album exceeded more than 1.71 million copies in pre-orders, setting a new record as SM Entertainment's highest pre-orders album of all time. It officially sold a million copies on the first week of release according to the Hanteo chart. The group achieved four number ones on Gaon Chart as Hot Sauce ranked first on the Album chart while the lead single of the same name topped the Digital, Download and BGM charts. On May 26, the album sold more than 2 million copies.

Track listing

Charts

Weekly charts

Monthly charts

Year-end charts

Certifications and sales

Accolades

Release history

References 

NCT Dream albums
SM Entertainment albums
2021 debut albums